The Columbus Register of Historic Properties is a register for historic buildings and other sites in Columbus, Ohio, United States. The register is maintained by the City of Columbus Historic Resources Commission and Historic Preservation Office, and was established in 1980. Many of these landmarks are also listed on the National Register of Historic Places, providing federal tax support for preservation, and some are further designated National Historic Landmarks, providing additional federal oversight.

The Columbus Register includes 82 entries, including 54 on the National Register. Two of the city's three National Historic Landmarks are on the register: the Ohio Statehouse and Captain Edward V. Rickenbacker House, but not the Ohio Theatre. The city also maintains four historic districts not listed on its register: German Village, Italian Village, Victorian Village, and the Brewery District.

Attributes

Criteria

The Columbus Register of Historic Properties is the City of Columbus's official list of significant buildings, sites, and districts. Its entries must be at least 40 years old, and meet at least one of the following instances:
 Have a design or style with historical, architectural, or cultural significance to the city, state, or country
 Be closely and publicly identified with a person of historical, architectural, or cultural significance to the city, state, or country
 Be a significant work of an architect, engineer, landscape architect, or builder, whose works have influenced the city, state, or nation
 Demonstrate workmanship in design, detail, or material uses
 Be closely and publicly identified with event(s) of historical, architectural, or cultural significance to the city, state, or country

Agencies
The Columbus Historic Preservation Office, part of the Department of Development, helps owners preserve their buildings, answering questions and guiding applicants through the Certificate of Appropriateness process. The office reviews the applications before adding them to the Historic Resources Commission agenda. The office is also responsible for general preservation planning.

The Historic Resources Commission is a committee appointed by the mayor for three-year terms, without compensation, meeting once per month. The board generally consists of architects, lawyers, historic preservation professionals, realtors, contractors, business owners, and historic property owners. The committee preserves and improves the sites on the register, promotes historic preservation, encourages reinvestment in historic buildings, studies problems and needs in furthering preservation, and reviews rezoning, special permit, and variance requests, making recommendations for approval.

Effects
Listing on the Columbus Register protects properties and neighborhoods from changes to an area's historic or architectural nature. Owners are offered restoration advice from the staff of the Columbus Historic Preservation Office and the Historic Resources Commission.

Any site listed on the register is not required to undergo specific changes or improvements, though any exterior work requires a Certificates of Appropriateness from the Columbus Historic Preservation Office. When owners propose zoning changes, variants, or request special permits, the Historic Resources Commission reviews the proposal and makes a recommendation before passing it onto the zoning board or city council.

List of historic properties
For consistency, the list below uses the name used on the Columbus Register of Historic Properties.

See also

 National Register of Historic Places listings in Columbus, Ohio

References

External links

 
 Map of individual sites and historic districts
 Map of national and local historic sites and districts, Ohio History Connection
 City of Columbus legislation, holding Columbus Register nominations

 
Columbus, Ohio-related lists
Locally designated landmarks in the United States
Lists of landmarks
History of Columbus, Ohio
1980 establishments in Ohio
Lists of buildings and structures in Ohio